Alain Bernat Gallego  (born 1 November 1971) is an Andorran politician. He is a member of the Liberal Party of Andorra.

External links
Page at the General Council of the Principality of Andorra

Members of the General Council (Andorra)
1971 births
Living people
Liberal Party of Andorra politicians
Place of birth missing (living people)
21st-century Andorran politicians